Albert Thomas "Ab" DeMarco Jr. (born February 27, 1949) is an American-born Canadian former professional ice hockey defenceman who played in the National Hockey League (NHL) and World Hockey Association (WHA) during the 1970s. DeMarco was noted for his shot, considered one of the hardest in the sport at the time. He is the son of Ab DeMarco Sr., who starred for the New York Rangers in the 1940s.

Playing career
DeMarco was born in the United States while his father was playing for the American Hockey League (AHL) Cleveland Barons, but was raised in North Bay, Ontario. He played his junior hockey for the Kitchener Rangers and, after representing Canada at the 1969 Ice Hockey World Championships, he was signed by the New York Rangers, the team with which his father spent the majority of his career.

DeMarco played his first two professional seasons in the CHL minor league, earning brief NHL callups to New York. In 1971–72, he played with the Rangers full-time, appearing in two thirds of the scheduled games, recording 4 goals and 11 points in 48 games. Late in the 1972–73 season, DeMarco was dealt to the St. Louis Blues. Given an opportunity to play more and receive time on the power play, DeMarco responded with 13 points in 14 games, to give him a total of 30 points on the season.

Early into the next season, DeMarco was traded to the Pittsburgh Penguins. This would be the pattern of his career, as he would become something of a nomad, as offense-starved teams would pick him up to help their power play, but eventually grow frustrated at his poor defensive play, and he would find himself on the move again. He finished the 1973–74 season with a career high 31 points in 59 games between St. Louis and Pittsburgh.

Early in the 1974–75 NHL season, DeMarco was traded to the Vancouver Canucks. In Vancouver, he posted a career-high 12 goals, playing a career high 69 (of 78) games, helping the team to a division championship and their first-ever playoff berth. His 9 power play goals for a blueliner that season ranked behind only Bobby Orr and Guy Lapointe.

After a poor offensive start to the 1975–76 NHL season, DeMarco was traded to the Los Angeles Kings, and his offensive output fell to 18 points in 64 games. DeMarco spent most of the 1976–77 season in the minors, appearing in just 33 games for LA and scoring 6 points.

DeMarco then jumped to the rival World Hockey Association, signing with the Edmonton Oilers for the 1977–78 WHA season. He spent just one season in Edmonton, registering 6 goals and 14 points in 47 games.

DeMarco returned to the NHL for the 1978–79 season, signing with the Boston Bruins, but appeared in only three games for the team. After a season in Switzerland, he retired in 1980. He finished his career with totals of 44 goals and 80 assists for 124 points in 344 NHL games over 9 seasons.

Career statistics

Regular season and playoffs

International

External links

1949 births
Living people
American men's ice hockey defensemen
Canadian ice hockey defencemen
Edmonton Oilers (WHA) players
Fort Worth Texans players
HC Ambrì-Piotta players
Ice hockey people from Cleveland
Ice hockey people from Ontario
Kitchener Rangers players
Los Angeles Kings players
New York Rangers players
Omaha Knights (CHL) players
Ontario Hockey Association Senior A League (1890–1979) players
Pittsburgh Penguins players
St. Louis Blues players
Sportspeople from North Bay, Ontario
Vancouver Canucks players